Inverugie Castle was a castle, about  north-west of Elgin, Moray, Scotland, and  south of Hopeman.

History
The castle belonged to the Young family.  A later house at the site was constructed by the Mortimer family.
Around 1824 the stones of the castle of Inverugie were cleared at the time of the lease of the Clashach Quarries.

Structure
No traces of the castle remain.  The site was a rocky promontory.

See also
Castles in Great Britain and Ireland
List of castles in Scotland

References

Castles in Moray
Demolished buildings and structures in Scotland